was an educational children's television show produced by NHK between 1967 and 1990.

The show consisted of 15-minute episodes centered on crafts, mainly using paper. It showed kids how to use scissors and adhesive tape.

Dekirukana was broadcast during the 1980s and 1990s with great success in many state-run networks in Latin America, to whom NHK donated the programme, along with other educational shows. In these countries the name of the show was translated as ¿Puedo hacerlo yo? ("Can I do it?"), but it is informally known as Nopo y Gonta, after the main characters.

External links 
 NOPPOSAN.JP
 Noppo-san ga utatta nichi
 Gonta at the NHK character museum 

Japanese children's television series
NHK original programming
Arts and crafts television series
1967 Japanese television series debuts
1990 Japanese television series endings
1960s Japanese television series
1970s Japanese television series
1980s Japanese television series
1990s Japanese television series